KWLY may refer to:

 KJUL, a radio station (104.7 FM) licensed to Moapa Valley, Nevada, United States, which used the call sign KWLY from July 2005 to November 2005
 The Radio Club at Utah Valley University